After Love is a 2016 French-Belgian drama film directed by Joachim Lafosse. It was screened in the Directors' Fortnight section at the 2016 Cannes Film Festival.

Cast
 Bérénice Bejo as Marie
 Cédric Kahn as Boris
 Marthe Keller as Christine
 Catherine Salée as The friend

Accolades

References

External links
 

2016 films
2016 drama films
2010s French-language films
Belgian drama films
French drama films
Films directed by Joachim Lafosse
Films about divorce
French-language Belgian films
2010s French films